Professor Jouke de Vries (born 26 September 1960 in Dearsum) is chairman of the Executive Board of the University of Groningen (RUG) in The Netherlands. Before that he was Dean of the University of Groningen/Campus Fryslân in Leeuwarden.

De Vries grew up in the village of Balk in Friesland and in 1979 started his studies in political science at the University of Amsterdam. He has been working at the group Leaderships Art  at the University of Leiden since 1984. De Vries obtained his PhD in 1989 from H. Daudt and H. Daalder on the article he wrote on "Ground Politics" (later made into a novel by the same name) and the educational essay "Cabinet Crisis in the Netherlands".

In 2002 he was a candidate for the leadership of the Partij van de Arbeid, but got only two percent of the votes of the party members against sixty percent for the chosen leader Wouter Bos. He teaches students at Leiden University in his role as a Professor of political science (Dutch:Hoogleraar). He regularly speaks to international groups of students, especially exchange students. He is currently a columnist for a Dutch language website, where he writes his own blog each week. Here he writes on recent news from the worlds of politics and economics.

Jouke de Vries is member of the board of The Hague Institute for Global Justice.

Jouke de Vries worked in Leeuwarden as dean of University of Groningen/Campus Fryslân until he was promoted to president of the University of Groningen on October 1, 2018. De Vries is married to Margriet Ekens and has two children, son Hidde de Vries and daughter Jildou de Vries.

References

External links 
 Homepage 

1960 births
Living people
Dutch civil servants
Dutch public administration scholars
Labour Party (Netherlands) politicians
Frisian scientists
Academic staff of Leiden University
People from Boarnsterhim